Platymetopius is a genus of leafhoppers (family Cicadellidae), containing over 75 species, mostly Old World.

Selected species
 Platymetopius abbreviatus
 Platymetopius abruptus Ball

References

Cicadellidae
Hemiptera genera
Taxa named by Hermann Burmeister